Scream Real Loud...Live! is a live album by American hardcore punk band 7 Seconds, recorded in 2000.

Track listing

References

2000 live albums
7 Seconds (band) albums
SideOneDummy Records live albums
Skate punk albums